Bailando por un Sueño 2007 was the fourth Argentine season of Bailando por un Sueño.

The first show of the season aired on April 16, 2007 as part of the original show, Showmatch, broadcast on Canal 13 and hosted by Marcelo Tinelli. This time, there were 32 couples competing, and the competition lasted 30 weeks. The winner was revealed on the season finale, on November 6, 2007:  the comedian and model Celina Rucci, who was paired with the professional dancer, Matías Sayago.

The panel of judges had one change: Reina Reech left and was replaced by model, actress and vedette Graciela Alfano. The other judges from the previous season stayed on:  Moria Casán, Jorge Lafauci and Gerardo Sofovich.

Couples

 Rodrigo "La Hiena" Barrios left the competition, and José María Listorti entered in his place.
 Catherine Fulop left the competition, and Cinthia Fernández entered in her place.
 Winners of the re-entry (round 18):
Anabel Cherubito (replacing Soledad Fandiño) & Lucas Álvarez Márquez
Claudia Fernández (replacing Iliana Calabró) & Maximiliano D'Iorio
Flavia Palmiero & Exequiel López
María Eugenia Ritó (replacing Juana Repetto) & Esteban Hernández
Silvia Süller (replacing Carmen Barbieri) & Leandro Ángelo.

Scoring chart

Red numbers indicate the lowest score for each week.
Green numbers indicate the highest score for each week.
 indicates the couple eliminated that week.
 indicates the couple was saved by the public.
 indicates the couple was saved by the jury.
 indicates the couple withdrew.
 indicates the winning couple.
 indicates the runner-up couple.
 indicates the semi-finalists couples.

In the eleventh duel Nazarena Vélez was replaced by Claudia Fernández.
In the twenty-third duel Catherine Fulop was replaced by Cinthia Fernández.
 replaced by Fernanda Vives.
 replaced by Claudia Albertario.
 replaced by Marcelo "Teto" Medina.
 replaced by Guillermo Novellis.
 replaced by Claudia Fernández.
 replaced by Jesica Cirio.
 replaced by Valeria Archimó.

Highest and lowest scoring performances
The best and worst performances in each dance according to the judges' marks are as follows:

Styles, scores and songs
Secret vote is in bold text.

April

May

June

July

August

Re-entry

September

October

Semi-final and Final

Argentina
Argentine variety television shows
2007 Argentine television seasons
2000s Argentine television series